Fred Sanderson (July 28, 1872 – August 2, 1928) was an American tennis player. He competed in the men's singles event at the 1904 Summer Olympics.

References

1872 births
1928 deaths
American male tennis players
Olympic tennis players of the United States
Tennis players at the 1904 Summer Olympics
People from Galesburg, Illinois
Sportspeople from Illinois
Tennis people from Illinois